Virgil Widrich (* 16 May 1967 in Salzburg) is an Austrian director, screenwriter, filmmaker and multimedia artist.

Widrich works on a large number of films and multimedia projects, sometimes as part of a creative team. He is known especially for his numerous short films and multimedia works.

Biography 

Born in Salzburg, Virgil Widrich spent his childhood in a house that is over 500 years old and stands on the Mönchsberg. While there he became acquainted with artists such as Peter Handke, who was his neighbour, and film director Wim Wenders, a frequent visitor. He gained his first experience with film at a very young age and was given his first camera, a Super-8, at the age of 13. That same year (1980) he made three films, "My Homelife", "Gebratenes Fleisch" and 3 mal Ulf. He followed that with an animated cartoon titled Auch Farbe kann träumen. At the age of 15 he made Monster in Salzburg, on which he worked with actors for the first time. He created the rampaging monster using stop-motion photography. In 1983 he began work on Vom Geist der Zeit (Spirit of Time). Even bad grades at school were not enough to prevent him finishing his first feature-length movie, which took him 14 months. During this time he also took on a job as an extra and props manager at the Salzburg Festival to finance his films. In 1984 he began to take an interest in computers and programmed a number of simple games.

After passing his school-leaving exams at the Akademisches Gymnasium in Salzburg he entered the Vienna Film Academy, only to leave again after a matter of weeks to work on the script for a science fiction film which, in the end, he never made. In 1987 he founded the film distributing company Classic Films with two partners with the aim of distributing mainly artistic films. Later on he became assistant to John Bailey, a camera man and director, and in 1990 he went to Hollywood to work with Bailey on the science fiction comedy The Search for Intelligent Life in the Universe. After selling Classic Films in 1991 Widrich again turned his attention to the computer and the possibilities it offered for creating art. His next major project, which saw him working as production manager, was a new festival for Austrian film, held for the first time in 1993 under the name Diagonale. In the second year he also compiled a film database. More databases relating to film followed, and he was also involved in the creation of an interactive CD-ROM.

In 1997 Widrich started concentrating more on making his own films again, producing the short film "tx-transform", which was a great success at the Ars Electronica festival. He also returned to his script for Heller als der Mond ("Brighter than the Moon"), which he filmed in 1999. The film premiered in 2000 in Rotterdam. Copy Shop was his next project, and one of his most successful to date. Following its premiere in 2001 the film won 35 awards, was nominated for the Oscar and was shown on television and at over 200 film festivals. His next short, Fast Film, was likewise very successful, won 36 international awards and was shown on over 300 film festivals. A large number of multimedia projects for companies followed (in 2001 he founded the company, checkpointmedia AG, and is its CEO) and he continued producing films with his company Virgil Widrich Film- und Multimediaproduktionen G.m.b.H. Together with other filmmakers he also co-founded the production company Amour Fou Film in 2001, focusing on arthouse movies from young directors.

In 2004 Widrich was a member of the jury for Ars Electronica and became chairman of the Austrian Film Directors’ Association until 2007. He is also a member of the Academy of Austrian Film. From 2007 to 2010 Virgil Widrich taught as Professor at the University of Applied Arts Vienna, teaching the class of “digital arts”. Since 2010 he is the leading Professor of the post-graduate Master Programme "Art & Science".

Virgil Widrich has three sons with the film director Anja Salomonowitz, one of whom, Oskar Salomonowitz (born 2008), known for his role in the film "This Movie is a Gift", died in an accident in 2020.

Exhibitions 
 2006: Virgil Widrich created computer-animated installations for the refurbished Mozarthaus Vienna. 
 2008: 13 works by Virgil Widrich and his students of “digital arts” were displayed at the “Essence08” in the Museum für angewandte Kunst Wien. 
 2009: Virgil Widrich took on the role as art director for the exhibition "Linz. City in Luck" at the museum Nordico, that formed part of the city's year as European Capital of Culture. 
 2009: "Alias in Wonderland" took place from 25 June to 12 July in the Freiraum/quartier 21 in the Museumsquartier in Vienna, a project carried out with his students. 
 2009: 10 works by his students of “digital arts” were displayed at the “Essence09” in the Expositur Vordere Zollamtsstraße Vienna. 
 2010: 15 works by his students of “digital arts” were displayed at the “Essence10” in the Vienna Künstlerhaus. 
 2010: Widrich was artistic director of the exhibition “90 Jahre Salzburger Festspiele” (90 years of the Salzburg Festival) at the Salzburg Museum.
 2011: Artistic director for the exhibition “parameter{world} - parameters for every or no thing” of the master “Art and Science” at the University of Applied Arts Vienna.
 2012: Works by his students of “Art & Science” were displayed at the “Essence12” in the Vienna Künstlerhaus.
 2013: "Crucial Experiments": exhibition of University of Applied Arts Vienna on behalf of Vienna Art Week 2013, MuseumsQuartier Wien/Ovalhalle, direction: Bernd Kräftner, Virgil Widrich
 2014: 2 works by his students of “Art & Science” were displayed at the “Essence14” in the Vienna Künstlerhaus. 
 2015: "Parallaxis" – media installation for the exhibition "A Rush of Color" at Leopold Museum.
 2016: [dis]placement – Information through Sound - of "Art & Science", Citygate Shopping, 1210 Vienna
 2017: "Circuit Training", 6 June to 17 June 2017, the white house, 1010 Vienna
 2017: Exhibition and retrospective "analog_digital - Die Dichotomie des Kinos", 3.10.2017 to 28.1. 2018, METRO Kinokulturhaus, 1010 Vienna: Film selection retrospective, participation in exhibition with two works
 2017: Exhibition contribution "Panzerschrank Potemkin" at the Vienna Design Week
 2017: Co-creation of the exhibition "Aesthetics of change – 150 years of the University of Applied Arts Vienna" at the MAK, Vienna
 2018: Co-creation of "Sound of Music World", Salzburg
 2018: Exhibition contribution "Voyage around my room" at the Vienna Design Week

Stage works 
 2012: Concept (in collaboration with Martin Haselböck and Frank Hoffmann), stage, visuals and film projections for "New Angels", which premiered on November 19, 2012 at the Théâtre National du Luxembourg.

Filmography 
 1980: My Homelife (A) 6 mins. (Documentary about an old house) 
 1980: Gebratenes Fleisch (A) 11 mins. (Crime thriller about the murder of a woman in a restaurant) 
 1980: 3 mal Ulf (A) 12 mins. (Documentary about Arnulf Komposch) 
 1981: Auch Farbe kann träumen (A) 12 mins. (Animated cartoon in which a worm and a little man flee from the destruction of the environment) 
 1982: Monster in Salzburg (A) 12 mins. (Animated film in which a monster goes on the rampage in Salzburg) 
 1983-85: Vom Geist der Zeit (A) 112 mins. (An assortment of many different genres) 
 1998: tx-transform (A) 5 mins. (Experimental animated film using intriguing techniques, co-directed by Martin Reinhart) 
 2000: Heller als der Mond (Brighter than the Moon) (Europe) 88 mins. (Comedy about being a foreigner in Vienna) 
 2001: Copy Shop (A) 12 mins. (A man copies himself until he fills the entire world) 
 2001: LinksRechts (A, F) 4 mins. (Interviews on the subject of "Left and right in film and politics") 
 2003: Fast Film (A, LUX) 14 mins. (animated film with printed scraps of other films telling the story of a chase) 
 2010: make/real (A), 5 mins. (Found-footage film for the exhibition "Robot Dreams" which was being staged at the Museum Tinguely in Basel and the Kunsthaus Graz
 2011: warning triangle (A), 6 mins. (Found-footage film for the exhibition “Fetisch Auto. Ich fahre, also bin ich.” which was being staged at the Museum Tinguely in Basel
 2015: back track (A), 7 mins. (Found-footage film in 3D)
 2016: Vienna table trip (A), 1 min. 22 sec. (found-footage animated film)
 2016: Night of a 1000 Hours (feature film)
 2018: Icon Island – a live battle of pictures and sounds (AUT), 70 min. (Film and Music live-performance)
 2018: Nena & Dave Stewart: Be my Rebel (D), 3 min. 45 sek., music video
 2018: Light Matter (A), 5 min, experimental film
 2019: tx-reverse (A, D), 5 min, experimental film, co-directed by Martin Reinhart

Since 2011 project development for a feature-length animated film titles "Micromeo", screenplay in collaboration with Jean-Claude Carrière).

Accolades 
In total, Virgil Widrich's work has been awarded more than 150 international awards.

for Heller als der Mond (Brighter than the Moon) (2000):
 Scriptwriting prize of the City of Salzburg for the best script (1997) 
 Jean Carment Award for Lars Rudolph — Angers European First Film Festival (2000) 
 Laser Vidéo Titres Award — Angers European First Film Festival (2000)

for Copy Shop (2001):
 Academy Award for Best Live Action Short nomination
 Prix de la meilleure création sonore / Best Music and Sound Design — Festival du Court-Métrage de Clermont-Ferrand (26 January 2001 - 3 February 2001) 
 Best Experimental Short — Toronto — International Short Film Festival (6 June 2001–10 June 2001) 
 Kodak Award — Jury's choice for short film — Puchon 2001 - Int. Fantastic Film Festival (12 July 2001–20 July 2001) 
 Jury Prize — IMAGO 2001 - Covilha, Portugal (25 September 2001–30 September 2001) 
 Silberne Taube — Leipzig 2001 – 44th International Film Festival (16 October 2001–21 October 2001) 
 Best Short film — Lleida 2001 - inCurt (7 November 2001–11 November 2001) 
 Best Experimental — Shorts International Film Festival New York 2001 (12 November 2001–15 November 2001) 
 1st Comunidad de Madrid Award — Best Film — Madrid — Semana de Cine Experimental (16 November 2001–23 November 2001) 
 Best Short film — Barcelona L'alternativa 01 (16 November 2001–24 November 2001) 
 Jury Prize — Leuven Kort 2001 - International Short Film Festival (23 November 2001 - 2 December 2001) 
 Best Of Festival — Boston Underground Film Festival (20 February 2002–24 February 2002) 
 Prix des télévisions européennes — Brussels 02 - Festival of Fantasy, Thriller and Science Fiction (15 March 2002–30 March 2002) 
 Special Prize — Hiroshima 2002 - International Animation Festival (22 August 2002–26 August 2002) 
 Best Experimental Film — Thessaloniki 02 - Panorama of Ind. Film and Video Makers (14 October 2002–21 October 2002) 
 Jury's special prize — Tehran International Animation Festival (23 February 2003–27 February 2003)

for Fast Film (2003):
 Official selection Festival de Cannes (2003) (nomination) 
 Best Animated Short (C.O.R.E. Digital Pictures Award) - Worldwide Short Film Festival, Toronto (2003) 
 Grand Prix for Animation (Grande Prémio Animação) - Festival Internacional de Curtas Metragens de Vila do Conde, Portugal (2003) 
 Best Experimental Short Film – 52nd Int. Film Festival, Melbourne (2003) 
 Audience Award — Bearded Child Film Festival, Grand Rapids, MN / Boulder, CO USA (2003) 
 Most Imaginative Film — Odense Film Festival, Odense (2003) 
 High Risk Award — Fantoche – 4th International Festival for Animated Film, Zürich (2003) 
 Best Experimental Film — Panorama of Independent Film & Video Makers, Thessaloniki (2003) 
 Most innovative short — Leipzig International Festival for Documentaries and Animated Film (2003) 
 Grand Prix — Uppsala Short Film Festival (2003) 
 Premio de la Comunidad de Madrid a la Mejor Película — Semana de Cine Experimental de Madrid (2003) 
 Onda Curta, 2nd prize and jury's special mention — Cinanima Portugal (2003) 
 Innova Award — Animadrid, Spanien (2003) 
 Film Critics Award — Animafest Zagreb (2004) 
 ASIFA Korea Prize for best Experimental SICAF (2004) 
 Cartoon d'or — best animated cartoon Forum Galicia (2004)
 Part of the Animation Show of Shows

for Nena & Dave Stewart: Be my Rebel (2018)
 Mindfield Film Festival – Los Angeles – USA – Best Music Video: Platinum Award
 UNDO Divergent Film Awards – Arlington – USA – Best Music Video
 Mindfield Film Festival – Albuquerque – USA – Best Music Video: Platinum Award
 EIFA – European Independent Film Award – Paris – Best Music Video – Bronze Award
 Snowdance Film Awards – Los Angeles – USA – Best Visual VX
 Fort Worth Indie Film Showcase – USA – Best International Music Video
 NYC Indie Film Awards – USA – Best Music Video
 Hollywood Sun Awards – USA – Best Music Video
 Cosmic Film Festival – Florida – USA – Best Music Video
 Rosarito International Film Festival – Los Angeles – USA – Best Music Video
 Eurasia International Monthly Film Festival – Moskau – Best Music Video
 Royal Wolf Film Awards – Los Angeles – USA – Winner: Best FX, Best Director, Best Music Video: Gold Award
 Top Indie Film Awards – Online Festival – Winner: Best director, Best FX
 Enginuity Film Awards – Shepherdstown – USA – Winner: Best New Media Director
 West Wing Film Competition – Los Angeles – USA – Music Video: 1st Place Winner
 Lake View International Film Festival – Punjab – Indien – May 2018 Best Music Video of the Month
 Jaipur International Film Festival – JIFF – Indien – Top 2nd Music Video/Song
 LA Edge Film Awards – Los Angeles – USA – Best Music Video, Best Editing, Best Visual FX
 Silicon Beach Film Festival – Los Angeles – USA – Best Music Video
 Berlin Flash Film Festival – Monthly category winner April 2018 – Music Video
 SFAAF – South Film and Arts Academy Festival – Chile – Winner: best fx in a short film
 Mediterranean Film Festival (MedFF) – Siracusa, Italien – Music Video Competition: Best Music Video

for checkpointmedia: 
 September 2006: National Award for the “Mozarthouse Vienna” in the category "culture and entertainment" and an award in the category "Public information and services" for the “Visitor Center of the Austrian Parliament”.

External links 
 Official Homepage
 checkpointmedia
 Master of Art and Science
 
 Official YouTube channel

References

1967 births
Living people
Film people from Salzburg
Artists from Salzburg
Austrian film directors
Collage filmmakers
Multimedia artists